This is a list of parliamentary by-elections in the United Kingdom since 2010, with the names of the incumbent and victor and their respective parties. Where seats changed political party at the election, the result is highlighted: blue for a Conservative gain, red for a Labour gain, orange for a Liberal Democrat gain, purple for a UKIP gain and other colours for any other gains.

, a total of 49 by-elections have been held in this period. The first was held in January 2011 and the most recent in February 2023.

Process of resignation from the House of Commons

Where the cause of by-election is given as "resignation" or "seeks re-election", this indicates that the incumbent was appointed on his or her own request to an "office of profit under the Crown", either the Steward of the Chiltern Hundreds or the Steward of the Manor of Northstead. Accepting an office of profit under the Crown vacates the member's seat. This process is used because members of the House of Commons are not technically permitted to resign. A member who vacates their seat in this manner may stand for re-election.

By-elections

2019–present Parliament

2017–2019 Parliament
There were five by-elections in the 2017–2019 Parliament, which was the smallest number since the six month parliament that sat between the two general elections in 1974. Three were in seats held by Labour, one by the governing Conservatives and one by Sinn Féin, who do not take up their seats in the House of Commons. Four by-elections were won by the incumbent party and Liberal Democrats won a seat from Conservatives. One by-election was a result of the death of the incumbent MP, who represented Labour. Two by-elections were the result of recall petitions via the provisions of the Recall of MPs Act 2015, the first such in the country.

At the dissolution of Parliament in 2019 there were two vacancies: Bassetlaw and Buckingham, caused by the resignations of Labour member John Mann and the Speaker John Bercow. With the proximity of the 2019 general election, by-elections were not called for these seats. Buckingham was regained by the Conservatives, the party Bercow had represented before he took up the position, and the Conservatives also won Bassetlaw from Labour.

2015–2017 Parliament
There were 10 by-elections in the 2015–2017 Parliament (with a planned by-election in Manchester Gorton cancelled when the 2017 general election was called). Seven were in seats held by Labour, and three by the governing Conservatives. Eight by-elections were won by the incumbent party, the Conservatives won a seat from Labour and lost one to the Liberal Democrats. Three by-elections were a result of the death of the incumbent MPs, all of whom represented Labour.

At the dissolution of Parliament in 2017 there was one vacancy: Manchester Gorton, caused by the death of its Labour member Gerald Kaufman. With the close proximity of the 2017 general election on 8 June, the by-election previously called for 4 May had its writ cancelled by the House of Commons. All but two of the candidates nominated for the by-election then stood at the General Election, and the seat was held by Labour.

2010–2015 Parliament
There were 21 by-elections in the 2010–2015 Parliament. 14 were in seats held by Labour, four by the governing Conservatives, one by their coalition partners the Liberal Democrats and two by Sinn Féin, who do not take up their seats in the House of Commons. 17 by-elections were won by the incumbent party, Labour won a seat from the Conservatives and lost one to Respect, while UKIP gained two seats from the Conservatives after the incumbent MPs defected to the party and were re-elected. Six by-elections were a result of the death of the incumbent MPs, all of whom represented Labour. All six of those by-elections were also won by Labour.

Notes

References

See also
 List of United Kingdom by-elections (1979–2010)
 United Kingdom by-election records
 List of United Kingdom MPs by seniority (2010–2015)
 List of United Kingdom MPs by seniority (2015–2017)
 List of United Kingdom MPs by seniority (2017–2019)
 List of United Kingdom MPs by seniority (2019–present)

2010
21st century in the United Kingdom